Short Hand Operation is the third and final studio album by American christian punk band Ninety Pound Wuss, released in 1999 through Tooth & Nail Records. The album showcases a much more atmospheric side of the band, featuring the use of synthesizers. Jeff Suffering, vocalist of the band, was very satisfied with the record and considers it as the "best record [he'll] ever record".

Track listing

Personnel

Performers
Jeff Suffering - Vocals
Matt Johnson - Bass
Marty Martinez - Drums
John Spalding - Guitar

Production
Kip Beelman - Engineering
Steve Kravac - Production
Ninety Pound Wuss -  Music, production

References

External links

1999 albums
Ninety Pound Wuss albums